Drašča Vas is a village in the Municipality of Žužemberk in southeastern Slovenia. It lies on the right bank of the Krka River in the historical region of Lower Carniola. The municipality is now included in the Southeast Slovenia Statistical Region.

References

External links

Drašča Vas at Geopedia

Populated places in the Municipality of Žužemberk